The 29th United States Congress was a meeting of the legislative branch of the United States federal government, consisting of the United States Senate and the United States House of Representatives. It met in Washington, D.C. from March 4, 1845, to March 4, 1847, during the first two years of James Polk's presidency. The apportionment of seats in the House of Representatives was based on the 1840 United States census. Both chambers had a Democratic majority.

Major events

 March 4, 1845: James K. Polk became President of the United States
 October 10, 1845: The Naval School (later renamed the United States Naval Academy) opened in Annapolis, Maryland
 December 2, 1845: President Polk announced to Congress that the Monroe Doctrine should be strictly enforced and that the United States should aggressively expand into the West.
 April 25, 1846: Open conflict over border disputes of Texas's boundaries began the Mexican–American War

Major legislation

 May 13, 1846: Mexican–American War declared, ch. 16, 
 July 9, 1846: District of Columbia retrocession, ch. 35, 
 July 30, 1846: Walker tariff, ch. 74,

Treaties
 June 15, 1846: Oregon Treaty established the 49th parallel as the border between the United States and Canada, from the Rocky Mountains to the Strait of Juan de Fuca
 January 13, 1847: Treaty of Cahuenga ended the fighting in the Mexican–American War in California (not a formal treaty between nations but an informal agreement between rival military forces)

States admitted
 December 29, 1845: Texas admitted as the 28th state
 December 28, 1846: Iowa admitted as the 29th state

Party summary

Senate 
During this congress, two Senate seats were added for each of the new states of Texas and Iowa.

House of Representatives
During this congress, two House seats were added for each of the new states of Texas and Iowa.

Leadership

Senate
 President: George M. Dallas (D)
 President pro tempore: Willie P. Mangum (W), until March 4, 1845
 Ambrose Hundley Sevier (D), only on December 27, 1845
 David R. Atchison (D), from August 8, 1846

House of Representatives
 Speaker: John W. Davis (D)

Members
This list is arranged by chamber, then by state. Senators are listed by class and representatives are listed by district.
Skip to House of Representatives, below

Senate
Senators were elected by the state legislatures every two years, with one-third beginning new six-year terms with each Congress. Preceding the names in the list below are Senate class numbers, which indicate the cycle of their election. In this Congress, Class 1 meant their term began with this Congress, facing re-election in 1850; Class 2 meant their term ended with this Congress, facing re-election in 1846; and Class 3 meant their term began in the last Congress, facing re-election in 1848.

Alabama
 2. Dixon H. Lewis (D)
 3. Arthur P. Bagby (D)

Arkansas
 2. Chester Ashley (D)
 3. Ambrose H. Sevier (D)

Connecticut
 1. Jabez W. Huntington (W)
 3. John M. Niles (D)

Delaware
 1. John M. Clayton (W)
 2. Thomas Clayton (W)

Florida
 1. David Levy Yulee (D), from July 1, 1845
 3. James Westcott (D), from July 1, 1845

Georgia
 2. John M. Berrien (W), until May, 1845; from November 13, 1845
 3. Walter T. Colquitt (D)

Illinois
 2. James Semple (D)
 3. Sidney Breese (D)

Indiana
 1. Jesse D. Bright (D)
 3. Edward A. Hannegan (D)

Iowa
 2. Vacant after being admitted to the Union December 28, 1846
 3. Vacant after being admitted to the Union December 28, 1846

Kentucky
 2. James T. Morehead (W)
 3. John J. Crittenden (W)

Louisiana
 2. Alexander Barrow (W), until December 29, 1846
 Pierre Soulé (D), from January 21, 1847
 3. Henry Johnson (W)

Maine
 1. John Fairfield (D)
 2. George Evans (W)

Maryland
 1. Reverdy Johnson (W)
 3. James Pearce (W)

Massachusetts
 1. Daniel Webster (W)
 2. Isaac C. Bates (W), until March 16, 1845
 John Davis (W), from March 24, 1845

Michigan
 1. Lewis Cass (D)
 2. William Woodbridge (W)

Mississippi
 1. Jesse Speight (D)
 2. Robert J. Walker (D), until March 5, 1845
 Joseph W. Chalmers (D), from November 3, 1845

Missouri
 1. Thomas H. Benton (D)
 3. David R. Atchison (D)

New Hampshire
 2. Levi Woodbury (D), until September 20, 1845
 Benning W. Jenness (D), from December 1, 1845, until June 13, 1846
 Joseph Cilley (L), from June 13, 1846
 3. Charles G. Atherton (D)

New Jersey
 1. William L. Dayton (W)
 2. Jacob W. Miller (W)

New York
 1. Daniel S. Dickinson (D)
 3. John A. Dix (D)

North Carolina
 2. Willie P. Mangum (W)
 3. William H. Haywood Jr. (D), until July 25, 1846
 George E. Badger (W), from November 26, 1846

Ohio
 1. Thomas Corwin (W)
 3. William Allen (D)

Pennsylvania
 1. Daniel Sturgeon (D)
 3. James Buchanan (D), until March 5, 1845
 Simon Cameron (D), from March 13, 1845

Rhode Island
 1. Albert C. Greene (W)
 2. James F. Simmons (W)

South Carolina
 2. John C. Calhoun (D), from November 26, 1845
 3. George McDuffie (D), until August 17, 1846
 Andrew Butler (D), from December 4, 1846

Tennessee
 1. Hopkins L. Turney (D)
 2. Spencer Jarnagin (W)

Texas
 1. Thomas J. Rusk (D), from February 21, 1846 (newly admitted state)
 2. Sam Houston (D), from February 21, 1846 (newly admitted state)

Vermont
 1. Samuel S. Phelps (W)
 3. William Upham (W)

Virginia
 1. Isaac S. Pennybacker (D), December 3, 1845 – January 12, 1847
 James M. Mason (D), from January 21, 1847
 2. William S. Archer (W)

House of Representatives
The names of members of the House of Representatives are preceded by their district numbers.

Alabama
 . Edmund S. Dargan (D)
 . Henry W. Hilliard (W)
 . William L. Yancey (D), until September 1, 1846
 James L. Cottrell (D), from December 7, 1846
 . William W. Payne (D)
 . George S. Houston (D)
 . Reuben Chapman (D)
 . Felix G. McConnell (D), until September 10, 1846
 Franklin W. Bowdon (D), from December 7, 1846

Arkansas
 . Archibald Yell (D), until July 1, 1846
 Thomas W. Newton (W), from February 6, 1847

Connecticut
 . James Dixon (W)
 . Samuel D. Hubbard (W)
 . John A. Rockwell (W)
 . Truman Smith (W)

Delaware
 . John W. Houston (W)

Florida
 . Edward C. Cabell (W), from October 6, 1845, until January 24, 1846
 William H. Brockenbrough (D), from January 24, 1846

Georgia
 . Thomas Butler King (W)
 . Seaborn Jones (D)
 . George W. B. Towns (D), from January 5, 1846
 . Hugh A. Haralson (D)
 . John H. Lumpkin (D)
 . Howell Cobb (D)
 . Alexander H. Stephens (W)
 . Robert A. Toombs (W)

Illinois
 . Robert Smith (D)
 . John A. McClernand (D)
 . Orlando B. Ficklin (D)
 . John Wentworth (D)
 . Stephen A. Douglas (D), until March 3, 1847
 . Joseph P. Hoge (D)
 . Edward D. Baker (W), until January 15, 1847
 John Henry (W), from February 5, 1847

Indiana
 . Robert D. Owen (D)
 . Thomas J. Henley (D)
 . Thomas Smith (D)
 . Caleb B. Smith (W)
 . William W. Wick (D)
 . John W. Davis (D)
 . Edward W. McGaughey (W)
 . John Pettit (D)
 . Charles W. Cathcart (D)
 . Andrew Kennedy (D)

Iowa
 . S. Clifton Hastings (D), from December 28, 1846 (newly admitted state)
 . Shepherd Leffler (D), from December 28, 1846 (newly admitted state)

Kentucky
 . Linn Boyd (D)
 . John H. McHenry (W)
 . Henry Grider (W)
 . Joshua F. Bell (W)
 . Bryan R. Young (W)
 . John P. Martin (D)
 . William P. Thomasson (W)
 . Garrett Davis (W)
 . Andrew A. Trumbo (W)
 . John W. Tibbatts (D)

Louisiana
 . John Slidell (D), until November 10, 1845
 Emile La Sére (D), from January 29, 1846
 . Bannon G. Thibodeaux (W)
 . John H. Harmanson (D)
 . Isaac E. Morse (D)

Maine
 . John F. Scamman (D)
 . Robert P. Dunlap (D)
 . Luther Severance (W)
 . John D. McCrate (D)
 . Cullen Sawtelle (D)
 . Hannibal Hamlin (D)
 . Hezekiah Williams (D)

Maryland
 . John G. Chapman (W)
 . Thomas J. Perry (D)
 . Thomas W. Ligon (D)
 . William F. Giles (D)
 . Albert Constable (D)
 . Edward H. C. Long (W)

Massachusetts
 . Robert C. Winthrop (W)
 . Daniel P. King (W)
 . Amos Abbott (W)
 . Benjamin Thompson (W)
 . Charles Hudson (W)
 . George Ashmun (W)
 . Julius Rockwell (W)
 . John Quincy Adams (W)
 . Artemas Hale (W)
 . Joseph Grinnell (W)

Michigan
 . Robert McClelland (D)
 . John S. Chipman (D)
 . James B. Hunt (D)

Mississippi
 . Stephen Adams (D)
 . Jefferson Davis (D), until October 28, 1846
 Henry T. Ellett (D), from January 26, 1847
 . Robert W. Roberts (D)
 . Jacob Thompson (D)

Missouri
 . James B. Bowlin (D)
 . John S. Phelps (D)
 . Sterling Price (D), until August 12, 1846
 William McDaniel (D), from December 7, 1846
 . James H. Relfe (D)
 . Leonard H. Sims (D)

New Hampshire
 . James H. Johnson (D)
 . Mace Moulton (D)
 . Moses Norris Jr. (D)
 . Vacant

New Jersey
 . James G. Hampton (W)
 . Samuel G. Wright (W), until July 30, 1845
 George Sykes (D), from November 4, 1845
 . John Runk (W)
 . Joseph E. Edsall (D)
 . William Wright (W)

New York
 . John W. Lawrence (D)
 . Henry J. Seaman (A)
 . William S. Miller (A)
 . William B. Maclay (D)
 . Thomas M. Woodruff (A)
 . William W. Campbell (A)
 . Joseph H. Anderson (D)
 . William W. Woodworth (D)
 . Archibald C. Niven (D)
 . Samuel Gordon (D)
 . John F. Collin (D)
 . Richard P. Herrick (W), until June 20, 1846
 Thomas C. Ripley (W), from December 17, 1846
 . Bradford R. Wood (D)
 . Erastus D. Culver (W)
 . Joseph Russell (D)
 . Hugh White (W)
 . Charles S. Benton (D)
 . Preston King (D)
 . Orville Hungerford (D)
 . Timothy Jenkins (D)
 . Charles Goodyear (D)
 . Stephen Strong (D)
 . William J. Hough (D)
 . Horace Wheaton (D)
 . George O. Rathbun (D)
 . Samuel S. Ellsworth (D)
 . John De Mott (D)
 . Elias B. Holmes (W)
 . Charles H. Carroll (W)
 . Martin Grover (D)
 . Abner Lewis (W)
 . William A. Moseley (W)
 . Albert Smith (W)
 . Washington Hunt (W)

North Carolina
 . James Graham (W)
 . Daniel M. Barringer (W)
 . David S. Reid (D)
 . Alfred Dockery (W)
 . James C. Dobbin (D)
 . James I. McKay (D)
 . John R. J. Daniel (D)
 . Henry S. Clark (D)
 . Asa Biggs (D)

Ohio
 . James J. Faran (D)
 . Francis A. Cunningham (D)
 . Robert C. Schenck (W)
 . Joseph Vance (W)
 . William Sawyer (D)
 . Henry St. John (D)
 . Joseph J. McDowell (D)
 . Allen G. Thurman (D)
 . Augustus L. Perrill (D)
 . Columbus Delano (W)
 . Jacob Brinkerhoff (D)
 . Samuel F. Vinton (W)
 . Isaac Parrish (D)
 . Alexander Harper (W)
 . Joseph Morris (D)
 . John D. Cummins (D)
 . George Fries (D)
 . David A. Starkweather (D)
 . Daniel R. Tilden (W)
 . Joshua R. Giddings (W)
 . Joseph M. Root (W)

Pennsylvania
 . Lewis C. Levin (A)
 . Joseph R. Ingersoll (W)
 . John H. Campbell (A)
 . Charles J. Ingersoll (D)
 . Jacob S. Yost (D)
 . Jacob Erdman (D)
 . Abraham R. McIlvaine (W)
 . John Strohm (W)
 . John Ritter (D)
 . Richard Brodhead (D)
 . Owen D. Leib (D)
 . David Wilmot (D)
 . James Pollock (W)
 . Alexander Ramsey (W)
 . Moses McClean (D)
 . James Black (D)
 . John Blanchard (W)
 . Andrew Stewart (W)
 . Henry D. Foster (D)
 . John H. Ewing (W)
 . Cornelius Darragh (W)
 . William S. Garvin (D)
 . James Thompson (D)
 . Joseph Buffington (W)

Rhode Island
 . Henry Y. Cranston (W)
 . Lemuel H. Arnold (W)

South Carolina
 . James A. Black (D)
 . Richard F. Simpson (D)
 . Joseph A. Woodward (D)
 . Alexander D. Sims (D)
 . Armistead Burt (D)
 . Isaac E. Holmes (D)
 . Robert Rhett (D)

Tennessee
 . Andrew Johnson (D)
 . William M. Cocke (W)
 . John H. Crozier (W)
 . Alvan Cullom (D)
 . George W. Jones (D)
 . Barclay Martin (D)
 . Meredith P. Gentry (W)
 . Joseph H. Peyton (W), until November 11, 1845
 Edwin H. Ewing (W), from January 2, 1846
 . Lucien B. Chase (D)
 . Frederick P. Stanton (D)
 . Milton Brown (W)

Texas
 . David S. Kaufman (D), from March 30, 1846 (newly admitted state)
 . Timothy Pilsbury (D), from March 30, 1846 (newly admitted state)

Vermont
 . Solomon Foot (W)
 . Jacob Collamer (W)
 . George P. Marsh (W)
 . Paul Dillingham Jr. (D)

Virginia
 . Archibald Atkinson (D)
 . George C. Dromgoole (D)
 . William M. Tredway (D)
 . Edmund W. Hubard (D)
 . Shelton F. Leake (D)
 . James A. Seddon (D)
 . Thomas H. Bayly (D)
 . Robert M. T. Hunter (D)
 . John S. Pendleton (W)
 . Henry Bedinger (D)
 . William Taylor (D), until January 17, 1846
 James McDowell (D), from March 6, 1846
 . Augustus A. Chapman (D)
 . George W. Hopkins (D)
 . Joseph Johnson (D)
 . William G. Brown Sr. (D)

Non-voting members
 . Augustus C. Dodge (D), until December 28, 1846
 . Morgan L. Martin (D)

Changes in membership
The count below reflects changes from the beginning of the first session of this Congress.

Senate
 Replacements: 8
 Democrats (D): no net change
 Whigs (W): no net change
 Deaths: 3
 Resignations: 6
 Interim appointments: 1
 Seats of newly admitted states: 4
 Total seats with changes: 14

|-
| Florida(1)
| Vacant
| Florida admitted to the Union at end of previous congress
|  | David L. Yulee (D)
| Elected July 1, 1845

|-
| Florida(3)
| Vacant
| Florida admitted to the Union at end of previous congress
|  | James Westcott (D)
| Elected July 1, 1845

|-
| South Carolina(2)
| Vacant
| Senator Daniel E. Huger resigned in previous congress.Successor elected November 26, 1845.
|  | John C. Calhoun (D)
| Elected November 26, 1845

|-
| Virginia(1)
| Vacant
| Failure to elect
|  | Isaac S. Pennybacker (D)
| Elected December 3, 1845

|-
| Mississippi(2)
|  | Robert J. Walker (D)
| Resigned March 5, 1845, after being appointed U.S. Secretary of the Treasury.Successor appointed November 3, 1845.Appointee was later elected on an unknown date.
|  | Joseph W. Chalmers (D)
| Appointed November 3, 1845

|-
| Pennsylvania(3)
|  | James Buchanan (D)
| Resigned March 5, 1845, after being appointed U.S. Secretary of State
|  | Simon Cameron (D)
| Elected March 13, 1845

|-
| Massachusetts(2)
|  | Isaac C. Bates (W)
| Died March 16, 1845
|  | John Davis (W)
| Elected March 24, 1845

|-
| Georgia(2)
|  | John M. Berrien (W)
| Resigned May, 1845 when appointed to the Georgia Supreme Court
|  | John M. Berrien (W)
| Elected November 13, 1845

|-
| New Hampshire(2)
|  | Levi Woodbury (D)
| Resigned November 20, 1845, to become Associate Justice of the U.S. Supreme Court
|  | Benning W. Jenness (D)
| Appointed December 1, 1845

|-
| Texas(1)
| colspan=2 | Texas admitted to the Union December 29, 1845, and remained vacant until February 21, 1846
|  | Thomas J. Rusk (D)
| Elected February 21, 1846

|-
| Texas(2)
| colspan=2 | Texas admitted to the Union December 29, 1845, and remained vacant until February 21, 1846
|  | Sam Houston (D)
| Elected February 21, 1846

|-
| New Hampshire(2)
|  | Benning W. Jenness (D)
| Lost election to finish the term.Winner elected June 13, 1846.
|  | Joseph Cilley (L)
| Elected June 13, 1846

|-
| North Carolina(3)
|  | William H. Haywood Jr. (D)
| Resigned July 25, 1846, after having refused to be instructed by the North Carolina state legislature on a tariff question
|  | George E. Badger (W)
| Elected November 25, 1846

|-
| South Carolina(3)
|  | George McDuffie (D)
| Resigned August 17, 1846.Successor appointed December 4, 1846, and subsequently elected to finish the term.
|  | Andrew Butler (D)
| Seated December 4, 1846

|-
| Iowa(2)
| colspan=2 | Iowa admitted to the Union December 28, 1846
| Vacant
| Not filled this term

|-
| Iowa(3)
| colspan=2 | Iowa admitted to the Union December 28, 1846
| Vacant
| Not filled this term

|-
| Louisiana(2)
|  | Alexander Barrow (W)
| Died December 29, 1846
|  | Pierre Soulé (D)
| Elected January 21, 1847

|-
| Virginia(1)
|  | Isaac S. Pennybacker (D)
| Died January 12, 1847
|  | James M. Mason (D)
| Elected January 21, 1847
|}

House of Representatives
 Replacements: 12
 Democrats (D): 1 seat net gain
 Whigs (W): 1 seat net loss
 Deaths: 5
 Resignations: 6
 Contested election: 1
 Seats of newly admitted states: 4
 Total seats with changes: 17

|-
| 
| Vacant
| style="font-size:80%" | Florida admitted to the Union at end of previous congress
|  | Edward C. Cabell (W)
| Seated October 6, 1845
|-
| 
| Vacant
| style="font-size:80%" | Rep-elect Washington Poe declined the seat
|  | George W. Towns (D)
| Seated January 5, 1846
|-
| 
| colspan=2 style="font-size:80%" | Texas admitted into the Union December 29, 1845, and seat remained vacant until March 30, 1846
|  | David S. Kaufman (D)
| Seated March 30, 1846
|-
| 
| colspan=2 style="font-size:80%" | Texas admitted into the Union December 29, 1845, and seat remained vacant until March 30, 1846
|  | Timothy Pilsbury (D)
| Seated March 30, 1846
|-
| 
|  | Samuel G. Wright (W)
| style="font-size:80%" | Died July 30, 1845
|  | George Sykes (D)
| Seated November 4, 1845
|-
| 
|  | John Slidell (D)
| style="font-size:80%" | Resigned November 10, 1845, after being appointed Minister to Mexico, but government refused to accept him
|  | Emile La Sére (D)
| Seated January 29, 1846
|-
| 
|  | Joseph H. Peyton (W)
| style="font-size:80%" | Died November 11, 1845
|  | Edwin H. Ewing (W)
| Seated January 2, 1846
|-
| 
|  | William Taylor (D)
| style="font-size:80%" | Died January 17, 1846
|  | James McDowell (D)
| Seated March 6, 1846
|-
| 
|  | Edward C. Cabell (W)
| style="font-size:80%" | Lost contested election January 24, 1846
|  | William H. Brockenbrough (D)
| Seated January 24, 1846
|-
| 
|  | Jefferson Davis (D)
| style="font-size:80%" | Resigned some time in June, 1846 in order to take part in the Mexican War
|  | Henry T. Ellett (D)
| Seated January 26, 1847
|-
| 
|  | Richard P. Herrick (W)
| style="font-size:80%" | Died June 20, 1846
|  | Thomas C. Ripley (W)
| Seated December 17, 1846
|-
| 
|  | Archibald Yell (D)
| style="font-size:80%" | Resigned July 1, 1846, in order to take part in the Mexican War
|  | Thomas W. Newton (W)
| Seated February 6, 1847
|-
| 
|  | Sterling Price (D)
| style="font-size:80%" | Resigned August 12, 1846, in order to take part in the Mexican War
|  | William McDaniel (D)
| Seated December 7, 1846
|-
| 
|  | William L. Yancey (D)
| style="font-size:80%" | Resigned September 1, 1846
|  | James L. Cottrell (D)
| Seated December 7, 1846
|-
| 
|  | Felix G. McConnell (D)
| style="font-size:80%" | Died September 10, 1846
|  | Franklin W. Bowdon (D)
| Seated December 7, 1846
|-
| 
|  | Augustus C. Dodge (D)
| colspan=3 style="font-size:80%" | Territory was dissolved after Iowa was admitted to the Union December 28, 1846
|-
| 
| colspan=2 style="font-size:80%" | Iowa admitted into the Union December 28, 1846
|  | S. Clinton Hastings (D)
| Seated December 28, 1846
|-
| 
| colspan=2 style="font-size:80%" | Iowa admitted into the Union December 28, 1846
|  | Shepherd Leffler (D)
| Seated December 28, 1846
|-
| 
|  | Edward D. Baker (W)
| style="font-size:80%" | Resigned January 15, 1847, in order to take part in the Mexican War
|  | John Henry (W)
| Seated February 5, 1847
|-
| 
|  | Stephen A. Douglas (D)
| style="font-size:80%" | Resigned March 3, 1847, at close of congress after being elected to the US Senate
| Vacant
| Not filled this term
|}

Committees
Lists of committees and their party leaders.

Senate
 Agriculture (Chairman: Daniel Sturgeon)
 Audit and Control the Contingent Expenses of the Senate (Chairman: Jesse Speight)
 Charges of Corruption Contained in the Daily Times (Select)
 Claims (Chairman: Isaac S. Pennybacker)
 Commerce (Chairman: William Haywood then John Adams Dix)
 Distributing Public Revenue Among the States (Select)
 District of Columbia (Chairman: William Haywood then Simon Cameron)
 Finance (Chairman: John C. Calhoun then Dixon H. Lewis)
 Foreign Relations (Chairman: William Allen then Ambrose H. Sevier)
 French Spoilations (Select) (Chairman: Daniel Webster)
 Indian Affairs (Chairman: Ambrose H. Sevier then Arthur P. Bagby)
 International Copyright Law (Select) (Chairman: Lewis Cass)
 Judiciary (Chairman: Chester Ashley) 
 Manufactures (Chairman: Daniel S. Dickinson)
 Memorial on W.T.G. Morton (Select)
 Memphis Convention (Select) (Chairman: John C. Calhoun)
 Military Affairs (Chairman: Thomas H. Benton)
 Militia (Chairman: David R. Atchison)
 Naval Affairs (Chairman: John Fairfield)
 Ordnance and War Ships (Select)
 Patents and the Patent Office (Chairman: Simon Cameron then Walter Colquitt)
 Pensions (Chairman: Henry Johnson)
 Post Office and Post Roads (Chairman: John M. Niles)
 Printing (Chairman: Charles G. Atherton)
 Private Land Claims (Chairman: David Levy Yulee)
 Public Buildings and Grounds (Chairman: Simon Cameron)
 Public Lands (Chairman: Sidney Breese)
 Retrenchment (Chairman: Dixon H. Lewis)
 Revolutionary Claims (Chairman: Thomas Clayton)
 Roads and Canals (Chairman: Edward A. Hannegan)
 Tariff Regulation (Select)
 Territories (Chairman: James Westcott)
 Smithsonian Institution (Select) (Chairman: John Adams Dix)
 Whole

House of Representatives

 Accounts (Chairman: Daniel P. King)
 Agriculture (Chairman: Joseph H. Anderson)
 Claims (Chairman: John Reeves Jones Daniel)
 Commerce (Chairman: Robert McClelland)
 District of Columbia (Chairman: Robert M.T. Hunter)
 Elections (Chairman: Hannibal Hamlin) 
 Engraving (Chairman: Jacob S. Yost)
 Expenditures in the Navy Department (Chairman: John F. Collin)
 Expenditures in the Post Office Department (Chairman: John H. Harmanson)
 Expenditures in the State Department (Chairman: Stephen Strong)
 Expenditures in the Treasury Department (Chairman: John F. Scammon)
 Expenditures in the War Department (Chairman: Owen D. Leib)
 Expenditures on Public Buildings (Chairman: Orlando B. Ficklin)
 Foreign Affairs (Chairman: Charles J. Ingersoll)
 Indian Affairs (Chairman: John A. McClernand)
 Invalid Pensions (Chairman: Preston King)
 Judiciary (Chairman: George O. Rathbun) 
 Manufactures (Chairman: John Quincy Adams)
 Mileage (Chairman: John P. Martin)
 Military Affairs (Chairman: Hugh A. Haralson)
 Militia (Chairman: James A. Black)
 Naval Affairs (Chairman: Isaac E. Holmes)
 Patents (Chairman: Thomas J. Henley)
 Post Office and Post Roads (Chairman: George W. Hopkins)
 Private Land Claims (Chairman: James B. Bowlin)
 Public Buildings and Grounds (Chairman: Orlando B. Ficklin)
 Public Expenditures (Chairman: Robert P. Dunlap)
 Public Lands (Chairman: John A. McClernand)
 Revisal and Unfinished Business (Chairman: Cullen Sawtelle)
 Revolutionary Claims (Chairman: Joseph Johnson)
 Revolutionary Pensions (Chairman: Richard Brodhead)
 Roads and Canals (Chairman: Robert Smith)
 Rules (Select)
 Standards of Official Conduct
 Territories (Chairman: Stephen A. Douglas)
 Ways and Means (Chairman: James I. McKay)
 Whole

Joint committees

 Enrolled Bills (Chairman: Sen. Jesse D. Bright)
 The Library (Chairman: N/A)
 Printing (Chairman: N/A)
 Smithsonian Bequest

Employees 
 Librarian of Congress: John Silva Meehan

Senate
 Chaplain: Septimus Tustin (Presbyterian), until December 16, 1846
 Henry Slicer (Methodist), elected December 16, 1846
 Secretary: Asbury Dickins
 Sergeant at Arms: Edward Dyer, died September 8, 1845
 Robert Beale, elected December 9, 1845

House of Representatives
 Chaplain: William H. Milburn (Methodist), elected December 3, 1845
 William T.S. Sprole (Presbyterian), elected December 7, 1846
 Clerk: Benjamin B. French
 Doorkeeper: Cornelius C. Whitney, elected December 3, 1845
 Postmaster: John M. Johnson
 Reading Clerks: 
 Sergeant at Arms: Newton Lane

See also 
 1844 United States elections (elections leading to this Congress)
 1844 United States presidential election
 1844–45 United States Senate elections
 1844–45 United States House of Representatives elections
 1846 United States elections (elections during this Congress, leading to the next Congress)
 1846–47 United States Senate elections
 1846–47 United States House of Representatives elections

Notes

References

External links
 Statutes at Large, 1789–1875
 Senate Journal, First Forty-three Sessions of Congress
 House Journal, First Forty-three Sessions of Congress
 Biographical Directory of the U.S. Congress
 U.S. House of Representatives: House History
 U.S. Senate: Statistics and Lists